Photidae is a family of amphipod crustaceans, containing the following genera:

Ampelisciphotis Pirlot, 1938
Audulla Chevreux, 1901
Corogammaropsis Tzvetkova, 1990
Dodophotis G. Karaman, 1985
Falcigammaropsis Myers, 1995
Gammaropsis Liljeborg, 1855
Graciliphotis Myers, 2009
Latigammaropsis Myers, 2009
Megamphopus Norman, 1869
Microphotis Ruffo, 1952
Papuaphotis Myers, 1995
Paranaenia Chilton, 1884
Photis Krøyer, 1842
Podoceropsis Boeck, 1861
Posophotis J. L. Barnard, 1979
Rocasphotis Souza-Filho & Serejo, 2010
Viragammaropsis Myers, 2009

References

Corophiidea
Crustacean families